Crotalaria bamendae is a species of plant in the family Fabaceae. It is found in Angola, Cameroon, and Nigeria. Its natural habitat is subtropical or tropical dry lowland grassland. It is threatened by habitat loss.

References

bamendae
Flora of Angola
Flora of Cameroon
Flora of Nigeria
Vulnerable plants
Taxonomy articles created by Polbot